The Cisplatine War, also known as the Argentine-Brazilian War or, in Argentine and Uruguayan historiography, as the Brazil War (Guerra del Brasil), the War against the Empire of Brazil (Guerra contra el Imperio del Brasil) or the Liberating Crusade (Cruzada Libertadora) in Uruguay, was an armed conflict in the 1820s between the United Provinces of the Río de la Plata and the Empire of Brazil over Brazil's Cisplatina province, in the aftermath of the United Provinces' and Brazil's independence from Spain and Portugal. It resulted in the independence of Cisplatina as the Oriental Republic of Uruguay.

Background
Led by José Gervasio Artigas, the region known as the Banda Oriental, in the Río de la Plata Basin, revolted against Spanish rule in 1811, against the backdrop of the 1810 May Revolution in Buenos Aires as well as the regional rebellions that followed in response to Buenos Aires' pretense of primacy over other regions in the Viceroyalty of the Río de la Plata. In the same context, the Portuguese Empire, then headquartered in Rio de Janeiro, took measures to solidify its hold on Rio Grande do Sul and to annex the region of the former Eastern Jesuit Missions.

From 1814 on, the Provincia Oriental, led by Artigas, joined forces with the provinces of Santa Fe and Entre Rios in a loose confederation called the Federal League, which resisted Buenos Aires' authority. After a series of banditry incidents in the territory which was previously claimed by the Portuguese Empire, in what is today the state of Rio Grande do Sul in Brazil, the now United Kingdom of Portugal, Brazil and the Algarves invaded the Banda Oriental in 1816.

Artigas was finally defeated by the Luso-Brazilian troops in 1820 at the Battle of Tacuarembó. The United Kingdom of Portugal, Brazil and the Algarves then formally annexed the Banda Oriental as a province of the Kingdom of Brazil, under the name Cisplatina, with support from local elites. With the annexation, the United Kingdom of Portugal, Brazil and the Algarves now enjoyed strategic access to the Río de la Plata and control of the estuary's main port, the city of Montevideo.

After Brazilian independence, in 1822, Cisplatina remained as a province of the newly formed Empire of Brazil. It sent two delegates to the 1823 Constituent Assembly that was tasked with drafting Brazil's first constitution. The constitution drafted by the Assembly was rejected by Emperor Pedro I, who dissolved the Assembly and issued a constitution himself in 1824. Under the 1824 Constitution, the Cisplatina province enjoyed a considerable degree of autonomy, more so than other provinces within the Empire.

Conflict 

While initially supporting the United Kingdom of Portugal, Brazil and the Algarves' intervention in the Banda Oriental, the United Provinces of the Río de la Plata later urged the local populace to rise up against Brazilian authority, covertly giving them political and material support aiming to establish sovereignty over the region.

Rebels led by Fructuoso Rivera and Juan Antonio Lavalleja carried on resistance against Brazilian rule. On 25 August 1825, an assembly of delegates from all over the Banda Oriental met in Florida and declared its independence from Brazil, while also declaring, at the same time, its allegiance to the United Provinces of the Río de la Plata. On 25 October 1825 the congress of the United Provinces declared the annexation of the Banda Oriental. In response, Brazil declared war on the United Provinces on 10 December 1825.

The two navies which confronted each other in the Río de la Plata and the South Atlantic were in many ways opposites. The Empire of Brazil was a major naval power with 96 warships, large and small, an extensive coastal trade and a large international trade carried on mostly in British, French and American ships. The United Provinces had similar international trading links but had few naval pretensions. Its navy consisted of only half a dozen warships and a few gunboats for port defence. Both navies were short of indigenous sailors and relied heavily on British—and, to a lesser extent—American and French officers and sailors, the most notable of which were the Irish born admiral William Brown, and the commander of the Brazilian inshore squadron, the English commodore James Norton.

The strategy of the two nations reflected their respective positions. The Brazilians immediately imposed a blockade on the Río de la Plata and the trade of Buenos Aires on 31 December 1825, while the Argentines attempted to defy the blockade using Brown's squadron while unleashing a swarm of privateers to attack Brazilian seaborne commerce in the South Atlantic from their bases at Ensenada and more distant Carmen de Patagones. The Argentines gained some notable successes—most notably by defeating the Brazilian flotilla on the Uruguay River at the Battle of Juncal and by beating off a Brazilian attack on Carmen de Patagones. But by 1828, the superior numbers of Brazil's blockading squadrons had effectively destroyed Brown's naval force at the Monte Santiago and was successfully strangling the trade of Buenos Aires and the government revenue it generated.

On land, the Argentine army initially crossed the Río de la Plata and established its headquarters near the town of Durazno. General Carlos María de Alvear invaded Brazilian territory and a series of skirmishes followed. Emperor Pedro I planned a counteroffensive by late 1826, and managed to gather a small army mainly composed of southern Brazilian volunteers and European mercenaries. The recruiting effort was hampered by local rebellions throughout Brazil, which forced the Emperor to relinquish direct command of his Army, return to Rio de Janeiro and bestow command of the troops on Felisberto Caldeira Brant, Marquis of Barbacena. The Brazilian counteroffensive was eventually stopped at the Battle of Ituzaingó.

Ituzaingó was the only battle of some magnitude in the whole war. A series of smaller clashes ensued, including the Battle of Sarandí, and the naval Battles of Juncal and Monte Santiago. Scarcity of volunteers severely hampered the Brazilian response, and by 1828 the war effort had become extremely burdensome and increasingly unpopular in Brazil. That year, Rivera reconquered the territory of the former Eastern Jesuit Missions.

Aftermath 

The stalemate in the Cisplatine War was caused by the inability of the Argentine and Uruguayan land forces to capture major cities in Uruguay and Brazil, the severe economic consequences imposed by the Brazilian blockade of Buenos Aires, and the lack of manpower for a full-scale Brazilian land offensive against Argentine forces. There was also increasing public pressure in Brazil to end the war. All of this motivated the interest on both sides for a peaceful solution.

Given the high cost of the war for both sides and the threat it posed to trade between the United Provinces and the United Kingdom, the latter pressed the two belligerent parties to engage in peace negotiations in Rio de Janeiro. Under British and French mediation, the United Provinces of the Río de la Plata and the Empire of Brazil signed the 1828 Treaty of Montevideo, which acknowledged the independence of the Cisplatina under the name Eastern Republic of Uruguay.

The treaty also granted Brazil sovereignty over the eastern section of the former Eastern Jesuit Missions and, most importantly, guaranteed free navigation of the Río de la Plata, a central national security issue for the Brazilians.

In Brazil, the loss of Cisplatina added to growing discontent with Emperor Pedro I. Although it was far from the main reason, it was a factor that led to his abdication in 1831.

Legacy
Although the war was not a war of independence, as none of the belligerents fought to establish an independent nation, it has a similar recognition within Uruguay. The Thirty-Three Orientals are acknowledged as national heroes, who freed Uruguay from Brazilian rule. The landing of the Thirty-Three Orientals is also known as the "Liberation crusade".

The war has a similar reception within Argentina, considered as a brave fight against an enemy of superior forces. The Argentine Navy has named many ships after people, events and ships involved in the war. William Brown (known as "Guillermo Brown" in Argentina) is considered the father of the Argentine navy, and is treated akin to an epic hero for his actions in the war. He is also known as the "Nelson of the Río de la Plata".

Brazil has had little interest in the war beyond naval warfare buffs. Few Brazilian historians have examined it in detail. The national heroes of Brazil are instead from Brazilian independence, the conflicts with Rosas (Platine War) or the Paraguayan War.

Despite the role of Britain in the war, and the presence of British naval officials on both sides of the conflict, the war is largely unknown in the English-speaking world.

See also
Platine Wars
Brazil–Uruguay relations
Argentina–Brazil relations
List of wars involving Brazil
List of wars involving Argentina

References

Notes

Citations

Bibliography

In English

In Portuguese

In Spanish

External links 
 

 
1820s in Argentina
1820s in Brazil
1820s in Uruguay
Colonial Uruguay
Empire of Brazil
History of South America
Maritime history of Argentina
Wars involving Argentina
Wars involving Brazil
Wars involving Uruguay
Invasions by Argentina